George Whitesides may refer to:

 George M. Whitesides (born 1939), American chemist
 George T. Whitesides, American space scientist and son of the above